Boban Nikolić (Serbian Cyrillic: Бобан Николић; born 8 October 1980) is a former Serbian footballer who played as a left-back.

External links
 Profile at Srbijafudbal
 Jelenfootball.com Profile

1980 births
Living people
Sportspeople from Kragujevac
Serbian footballers
Serbian expatriate footballers
FK Radnički 1923 players
FK Banat Zrenjanin players
Shahin Bushehr F.C. players
Expatriate footballers in Iran
Serbian expatriate sportspeople in Iran
FK Jagodina players
Serbian SuperLiga players
Expatriate footballers in Indonesia
Serbian expatriate sportspeople in Indonesia
Pelita Bandung Raya players
Liga 1 (Indonesia) players
Association football defenders